Portugal was represented at the 2012 European Athletics Championships, held in Helsinki, Finland, from 27 June to 1 July 2012, with a delegation of 35 competitors (18 men and 17 women), who took part in 17 events.

Medalists

Participants

Results

Men

Track

Field

Women

Track

Field

Nations at the 2012 European Athletics Championships
2012
European Athletics Championships